General elections were held in Antigua and Barbuda on 11 February 1971. They were won by the Progressive Labour Movement. PLM leader George Walter was elected Premier of Antigua, defeating the incumbent Premier Vere Bird of the Antigua Labour Party. The PLM was founded in 1967 after a split in the leadership of the Antigua Trades and Labour Union; this was its first election, as well as its first and only electoral victory.

The 1971 election marked the first change of government in the history of Antigua and Barbuda. It was the first election held in the territory since its creation as a West Indies Associated State in 1967 and the end of its period under British colonial rule. Voter turnout was 56.4%.

Results

References

Elections in Antigua and Barbuda
Antigua
1971 in Antigua and Barbuda
February 1971 events in North America